The third season of Laverne & Shirley, an American television sitcom series, began airing on September 20, 1977 on ABC. The season concluded on May 30, 1978 after 24 episodes.

The season aired Tuesdays at 8:30-9:00 pm (EST). It ranked 1st among television programs and garnered a 31.6 rating. The entire season was released on DVD in North America on November 27, 2007.

Overview
The season revolves around the titular characters Laverne DeFazio and Shirley Feeney, bottle-cappers at Shotz Brewery between 1959 and 1960 in Milwaukee, Wisconsin. Episode plots include their adventures with neighbors and friends, Lenny and Squiggy.

Cast

Starring
Penny Marshall as Laverne DeFazio
Cindy Williams as Shirley Feeney
Michael McKean as Leonard "Lenny" Kosnowski
David Lander as Andrew "Squiggy" Squiggman
Phil Foster as Frank DeFazio
Eddie Mekka as Carmine Ragusa
Betty Garrett as Edna Babish

Episodes

References

Laverne & Shirley seasons
1977 American television seasons
1978 American television seasons